Cyfronydd Hall is a Welsh country house located on the A458 road between Welshpool and the hamlet of Cyfronydd, Llanfair Caereinion. It was built in about 1865 for the Pryce Jones family after an earlier hall on the site burned down. It once formed part of the 1,922-acre Cyfronydd Estate.

History

Cyfronydd Hall was sold by Major Hamilton Pryce in 1927 and at that time it had 19 bedrooms and one bathroom. In 1938 it was purchased for £7,250 by  Montgomeryshire County Council for use as a girls' school and remodelled, with the number of bedrooms being reduced to 14 and the number of bathrooms increased to four. The property at that time had  of land. 

In the 1990s the property was bought by an English couple, Jeff and Jean Bowskill, who gradually repaired and improved the property over a ten-year period. They added a swimming pool and a spa and sold the property in 2015 to William Hague and Ffion Hague. The estate now has .

Architecture

Pevsner Architectural Guides describe the present building briefly as follows: "Large square brick house of c. 1865 with vaguely French detail, particularly on the three-storey entrance tower with its chateau roof." Country Life has described the building more enthusiastically as follows:

The building does not appear to be registered by Cadw as a listed building.

Railway

Cyfronydd Hall is served by the nearby Cyfronydd railway station.

References 

Country houses in Powys